Odessa metropolitan area may refer to:

 The metropolitan area surrounding the city of Odesa, in Ukraine
 The Odessa metropolitan area, Texas, surrounding the city of Odessa, Texas, USA